The ImmunityBio COVID-19 vaccine, codenamed hAd5, is a non replicating viral vector COVID-19 vaccine developed by the United States-based ImmunityBio.

Manufacturing 
The BioVac Institute, a state-backed South African vaccine company, plans to use a deal it won to manufacture coronavirus vaccines.  The contract with American based ImmunityBio Inc is currently conducting phase 1 vaccine trials in South Africa

ImmunityBio and BioVac plan to distribute the vaccines throughout South Africa and Africa.

History 

In April 2020, a product developed by ImmunityBio was rumoured to be a potential SARS-CoV-2 coronavirus vaccine.

On 1 June 2020, the product was selected for inclusion on the Operation Warp Speed subsidy list, in order to fund monkey trials. The company "hope to receive approval from the Food and Drug Administration to begin an initial safety trial in humans in June 2020."

Clinical trials 
ImmunityBio Inc is currently conducting phase 1 vaccine trials in The United States and South Africa.

References

External links 

Clinical trials
American COVID-19 vaccines
Products introduced in 2021
Viral vector vaccines